Miezgovce is a village and municipality in Bánovce nad Bebravou District in the Trenčín Region of north-western Slovakia.

History
In historical records the village was first mentioned in 1389.
the Bánovská parenica (the most famous cycling race in region) is regularly organized every year on the 6. September and it goes through this village. The competition is available for a high range of cyclists. It starts in the town Bánovce nad Bebravou.

Geography
The municipality lies at an altitude of 240 metres and covers an area of 8.750 km². It has a population of about 245 people.

References

External links
  Official page
https://web.archive.org/web/20071116010355/http://www.statistics.sk/mosmis/eng/run.html

Villages and municipalities in Bánovce nad Bebravou District